HCMA may refer to:

 Alula Airport (ICAO code) in Alula (also called Caluula) in Bari region of northeastern Somalia
 Hypertrophic Cardiomyopathy Association, for the support, research and treatment of a disease enlarging part of the heart muscle, creating functional impairment of the heart, and is the leading cause of sudden cardiac death in young athletes
 Huron-Clinton Metropolitan Authority, the body that administers the Huron–Clinton Metroparks system in the Metro Detroit area of Michigan, USA